Ephysteris ruth is a moth in the family Gelechiidae. It was described by Povolný in 1977. It is found in Iran.

References

Ephysteris
Moths described in 1977